The Saint Mary's Huskies football team represents Saint Mary's University in Halifax, Nova Scotia in the sport of Canadian football in U Sports. The Huskies have been the most successful in the Atlantic University Sport (AUS) conference of U Sports football, reaching the Vanier Cup championship game nine times and winning three times (1973, 2001, 2002), both marks being the highest in the AUS. The program also has the most Jewett Trophy conference championships, winning 24 times in 32 appearances.

They would become the third university to win back-to-back championships (2001 & 2002) and the first of three universities to appear in at least three consecutive championship tournaments (2001–2003). The second being the Saskatchewan Huskies (2004–2006) and the third being the Laval Rouge et Or (2010–2013). As of 2019, the Huskies are the last AUS team to have both appeared in a Vanier Cup (2007) and to have won a Vanier Cup (2002).

The Hec Crighton Trophy was awarded four times to Saint Mary's Huskies players; three times to Chris Flynn (1988, 1989, 1990) and once to Erik Glavic in 2007. Flynn is the only player to have won the league MVP award three times and in 2011, he became the first player inducted into the Canadian Football Hall of Fame based solely on a university career.

Recent coaching history
Steve Sumarah was the head coach of the Huskies for six seasons from 2006 to 2011 and had his teams achieve four first-place finishes, along with one Vanier Cup appearance in 2007. He was fired on Dec. 5, 2011. Perry Marchese was hired as his replacement on February 17, 2012. Marchese had a record of 8-24 over four seasons and was replaced with James Colzie III in 2016. Colzie led the Huskies to an 18-20 record over five seasons and resigned from the Huskies in April 2022. Sumarah returned as head coach on June 8, 2022.

Season results since 1998

A. The September 24, 2022 Bishop's at Saint Mary's game was cancelled due to weather and the October 29, 2022 Saint Mary's at Bishop's game was worth four points with both teams playing seven games in 2022.

Championships

National Championships

Vanier Cup 
 Champions: 1973, 2001, 2002
 Runner-up: 1988, 1990, 1992, 1999, 2003, 2007

Semi-final championships

Uteck Bowl 
 Champions: 2003, 2007
 Runner-up: 2009

Mitchell Bowl 
 Runner-up: 2004, 2008, 2010

Churchill Bowl 
 Champions: 2002

Atlantic Bowl 
 Champions: 1964, 1973, 1988, 1990, 1992, 1999, 2001
 Runner-up: 1968, 1971, 1972, 1974, 1987, 1989, 1993, 1994, 2000

Conference Championships

Loney Bowl 
The Huskies have also been victorious in the Loney Bowl Conference Championship a record 24 times with their last coming in the 2010 season.

National award winners
Hec Crighton Trophy: Chris Flynn (1988, 1989, 1990), Erik Glavic (2007)
J. P. Metras Trophy: Mark Pothier (1975)
Presidents' Trophy: Alex Eliopoulos (1992), Jonathan Langa (2014)
Russ Jackson Award: David Sykes (1992, 1993), Ted MacLean (1995), Duncan Patterson (2022)
Frank Tindall Trophy: Larry Uteck (1988, 1993), Blake Nill (1999), Steve Sumarah (2009)

Huskies in the CFL
As of the end of the 2022 CFL season, five former Huskies players are on CFL teams' rosters:
Aaron Crawford, Calgary Stampeders
Adrian Greene, BC Lions
Brett Lauther, Saskatchewan Roughriders
Jarek Richards, Hamilton Tiger-Cats
Nigel Romick, Ottawa Redblacks

References

External links
 

 
Saint Mary's University (Halifax)
U Sports football teams